Cavey may refer to:

 Bruxy Cavey (born 1965), Canadian pastor and author
 John M. Cavey (1907–1982), American politician and lawyer
 Captain Caveman, a fictional character nicknamed "Cavey"
 Cavey Jr, the son of Captain Caveman